The Tebavii were a Gallic tribe dwelling in the Alps during the Iron Age.

Name 
They are mentioned as Tebaviorum on the Arch of Susa.

The suffix - (sing. -) is found in other Gaulish tribal names, such as Carnavii and Vellavii. It could mean 'desire, envy'.

Geography 
The Tebavii may have dwelled in the Ubaye valley, although their exact location remains uncertain.

History 
They are mentioned on the Arch of Susa, erected by Cottius in 9–8 BC.

References

Bibliography 

Historical Celtic peoples
Gauls
Tribes of pre-Roman Gaul